The 2001–02 Carolina Hurricanes season was the franchise's 23rd season in the National Hockey League and fifth as the Hurricanes. The Hurricanes made it as far as the Stanley Cup Finals, but lost in five games to the Detroit Red Wings.

Regular season
The Hurricanes had the most power-play opportunities of all 30 NHL teams, with 391.

Final standings

Playoffs

Schedule and results

Regular season

|- align="center" bgcolor="#CCFFCC" 
|1||W||October 5, 2001||3–1 || align="left"|  New York Rangers (2001–02) ||1–0–0–0 || 18,730 || 
|- align="center" bgcolor="#CCFFCC" 
|2||W||October 7, 2001||3–0 || align="left"|  Dallas Stars (2001–02) ||2–0–0–0 || 15,365 || 
|- align="center" bgcolor="#FFBBBB"
|3||L||October 9, 2001||2–6 || align="left"|  Ottawa Senators (2001–02) ||2–1–0–0 || 10,052 || 
|- align="center" bgcolor="#FFBBBB"
|4||L||October 11, 2001||2–3 || align="left"|  Toronto Maple Leafs (2001–02) ||2–2–0–0 || 14,106 || 
|- align="center" bgcolor="#CCFFCC" 
|5||W||October 13, 2001||5–2 || align="left"| @ Atlanta Thrashers (2001–02) ||3–2–0–0 || 18,545 || 
|- align="center" bgcolor="#FFBBBB"
|6||L||October 17, 2001||0–4 || align="left"|  New York Islanders (2001–02) ||3–3–0–0 || 12,237 || 
|- align="center" bgcolor="#FF6F6F"
|7||OTL||October 18, 2001||1–2 OT|| align="left"| @ New York Islanders (2001–02) ||3–3–0–1 || 9,647 || 
|- align="center" bgcolor="#CCFFCC" 
|8||W||October 20, 2001||2–1 OT|| align="left"|  Atlanta Thrashers (2001–02) ||4–3–0–1 || 14,219 || 
|- align="center" bgcolor="#FFBBBB"
|9||L||October 23, 2001||1–5 || align="left"| @ Colorado Avalanche (2001–02) ||4–4–0–1 || 18,007 || 
|- align="center" bgcolor="#CCFFCC" 
|10||W||October 24, 2001||7–3 || align="left"| @ Minnesota Wild (2001–02) ||5–4–0–1 || 18,064 || 
|- align="center" bgcolor="#FF6F6F"
|11||OTL||October 26, 2001||2–3 OT|| align="left"|  New York Islanders (2001–02) ||5–4–0–2 || 18,730 || 
|- align="center" bgcolor="#CCFFCC" 
|12||W||October 28, 2001||3–2 OT|| align="left"|  Los Angeles Kings (2001–02) ||6–4–0–2 || 14,355 || 
|- align="center" bgcolor="#FFBBBB"
|13||L||October 30, 2001||2–5 || align="left"|  Detroit Red Wings (2001–02) ||6–5–0–2 || 18,730 || 
|-

|- align="center" bgcolor="#FFBBBB"
|14||L||November 1, 2001||3–4 || align="left"| @ St. Louis Blues (2001–02) ||6–6–0–2 || 16,970 || 
|- align="center" bgcolor="#CCFFCC" 
|15||W||November 2, 2001||3–2 || align="left"|  New York Rangers (2001–02) ||7–6–0–2 || 18,730 || 
|- align="center" bgcolor="#CCFFCC" 
|16||W||November 4, 2001||1–0 OT|| align="left"|  Phoenix Coyotes (2001–02) ||8–6–0–2 || 12,599 || 
|- align="center" 
|17||T||November 6, 2001||2–2 OT|| align="left"|  Pittsburgh Penguins (2001–02) ||8–6–1–2 || 15,938 || 
|- align="center" bgcolor="#CCFFCC" 
|18||W||November 8, 2001||3–2 || align="left"| @ Washington Capitals (2001–02) ||9–6–1–2 || 15,372 || 
|- align="center" bgcolor="#CCFFCC" 
|19||W||November 9, 2001||3–2 || align="left"|  San Jose Sharks (2001–02) ||10–6–1–2 || 17,387 || 
|- align="center" 
|20||T||November 11, 2001||1–1 OT|| align="left"|  Edmonton Oilers (2001–02) ||10–6–2–2 || 12,390 || 
|- align="center" bgcolor="#FFBBBB"
|21||L||November 13, 2001||3–4 || align="left"| @ Detroit Red Wings (2001–02) ||10–7–2–2 || 20,058 || 
|- align="center" 
|22||T||November 15, 2001||1–1 OT|| align="left"| @ Ottawa Senators (2001–02) ||10–7–3–2 || 14,117 || 
|- align="center" bgcolor="#FFBBBB"
|23||L||November 17, 2001||0–2 || align="left"| @ Tampa Bay Lightning (2001–02) ||10–8–3–2 || 19,758 || 
|- align="center" bgcolor="#CCFFCC" 
|24||W||November 19, 2001||5–2 || align="left"|  Columbus Blue Jackets (2001–02) ||11–8–3–2 || 12,479 || 
|- align="center" 
|25||T||November 21, 2001||4–4 OT|| align="left"| @ Dallas Stars (2001–02) ||11–8–4–2 || 18,532 || 
|- align="center" bgcolor="#FFBBBB"
|26||L||November 25, 2001||0–4 || align="left"|  Tampa Bay Lightning (2001–02) ||11–9–4–2 || 13,561 || 
|- align="center" bgcolor="#CCFFCC" 
|27||W||November 27, 2001||5–2 || align="left"| @ Toronto Maple Leafs (2001–02) ||12–9–4–2 || 19,258 || 
|- align="center" bgcolor="#FFBBBB"
|28||L||November 29, 2001||0–5 || align="left"| @ New York Rangers (2001–02) ||12–10–4–2 || 17,542 || 
|- align="center" bgcolor="#FFBBBB"
|29||L||November 30, 2001||2–6 || align="left"| @ Washington Capitals (2001–02) ||12–11–4–2 || 17,372 || 
|-

|- align="center" bgcolor="#FF6F6F"
|30||OTL||December 2, 2001||3–4 OT|| align="left"|  Washington Capitals (2001–02) ||12–11–4–3 || 18,730 || 
|- align="center" bgcolor="#FFBBBB"
|31||L||December 4, 2001||2–4 || align="left"|  Buffalo Sabres (2001–02) ||12–12–4–3 || 11,838 || 
|- align="center" bgcolor="#CCFFCC" 
|32||W||December 8, 2001||3–2 || align="left"| @ Florida Panthers (2001–02) ||13–12–4–3 || 15,774 || 
|- align="center" bgcolor="#CCFFCC" 
|33||W||December 10, 2001||4–3 OT|| align="left"| @ New York Rangers (2001–02) ||14–12–4–3 || 17,554 || 
|- align="center" bgcolor="#CCFFCC" 
|34||W||December 12, 2001||4–1 || align="left"|  Florida Panthers (2001–02) ||15–12–4–3 || 10,281 || 
|- align="center" bgcolor="#FF6F6F"
|35||OTL||December 14, 2001||2–3 OT|| align="left"| @ Buffalo Sabres (2001–02) ||15–12–4–4 || 15,787 || 
|- align="center" bgcolor="#CCFFCC" 
|36||W||December 16, 2001||7–0 || align="left"| @ Pittsburgh Penguins (2001–02) ||16–12–4–4 || 14,226 || 
|- align="center" bgcolor="#FFBBBB"
|37||L||December 18, 2001||1–5 || align="left"|  Ottawa Senators (2001–02) ||16–13–4–4 || 11,166 || 
|- align="center" bgcolor="#CCFFCC" 
|38||W||December 21, 2001||5–4 OT|| align="left"|  Atlanta Thrashers (2001–02) ||17–13–4–4 || 17,288 || 
|- align="center" bgcolor="#FF6F6F"
|39||OTL||December 22, 2001||3–4 OT|| align="left"| @ Philadelphia Flyers (2001–02) ||17–13–4–5 || 19,685 || 
|- align="center" bgcolor="#CCFFCC" 
|40||W||December 26, 2001||4–3 || align="left"|  Toronto Maple Leafs (2001–02) ||18–13–4–5 || 18,730 || 
|- align="center" bgcolor="#CCFFCC" 
|41||W||December 27, 2001||3–2 || align="left"| @ Tampa Bay Lightning (2001–02) ||19–13–4–5 || 16,413 || 
|- align="center" 
|42||T||December 30, 2001||5–5 OT|| align="left"| @ Washington Capitals (2001–02) ||19–13–5–5 || 18,672 || 
|- align="center" bgcolor="#CCFFCC" 
|43||W||December 31, 2001||5–4 || align="left"| @ Buffalo Sabres (2001–02) ||20–13–5–5 || 18,173 || 
|-

|- align="center" bgcolor="#FFBBBB"
|44||L||January 2, 2002||3–6 || align="left"|  Boston Bruins (2001–02) ||20–14–5–5 || 12,404 || 
|- align="center" bgcolor="#FFBBBB"
|45||L||January 5, 2002||1–2 || align="left"|  New Jersey Devils (2001–02) ||20–15–5–5 || 18,730 || 
|- align="center" bgcolor="#FFBBBB"
|46||L||January 6, 2002||3–4 || align="left"|  Philadelphia Flyers (2001–02) ||20–16–5–5 || 18,730 || 
|- align="center" bgcolor="#CCFFCC" 
|47||W||January 10, 2002||4–1 || align="left"| @ Edmonton Oilers (2001–02) ||21–16–5–5 || 16,322 || 
|- align="center" bgcolor="#FFBBBB"
|48||L||January 12, 2002||1–7 || align="left"| @ Vancouver Canucks (2001–02) ||21–17–5–5 || 18,422 || 
|- align="center" bgcolor="#CCFFCC" 
|49||W||January 15, 2002||2–0 || align="left"|  Minnesota Wild (2001–02) ||22–17–5–5 || 10,712 || 
|- align="center" 
|50||T||January 17, 2002||1–1 OT|| align="left"|  Montreal Canadiens (2001–02) ||22–17–6–5 || 16,589 || 
|- align="center" 
|51||T||January 19, 2002||3–3 OT|| align="left"| @ New Jersey Devils (2001–02) ||22–17–7–5 || 19,040 || 
|- align="center" bgcolor="#FFBBBB"
|52||L||January 21, 2002||5–7 || align="left"|  Vancouver Canucks (2001–02) ||22–18–7–5 || 10,526 || 
|- align="center" 
|53||T||January 23, 2002||2–2 OT|| align="left"|  Nashville Predators (2001–02) ||22–18–8–5 || 11,129 || 
|- align="center" 
|54||T||January 25, 2002||1–1 OT|| align="left"|  Florida Panthers (2001–02) ||22–18–9–5 || 18,730 || 
|- align="center" bgcolor="#FFBBBB"
|55||L||January 26, 2002||2–4 || align="left"| @ Philadelphia Flyers (2001–02) ||22–19–9–5 || 19,747 || 
|- align="center" 
|56||T||January 29, 2002||2–2 OT|| align="left"|  Buffalo Sabres (2001–02) ||22–19–10–5 || 18,730 || 
|- align="center" bgcolor="#CCFFCC" 
|57||W||January 30, 2002||3–1 || align="left"| @ Tampa Bay Lightning (2001–02) ||23–19–10–5 || 13,234 || 
|-

|- align="center" 
|58||T||February 5, 2002||3–3 OT|| align="left"|  Pittsburgh Penguins (2001–02) ||23–19–11–5 || 18,730 || 
|- align="center" bgcolor="#FFBBBB"
|59||L||February 7, 2002||1–2 || align="left"| @ Los Angeles Kings (2001–02) ||23–20–11–5 || 15,960 || 
|- align="center" bgcolor="#CCFFCC" 
|60||W||February 8, 2002||4–1 || align="left"| @ Mighty Ducks of Anaheim (2001–02) ||24–20–11–5 || 10,589 || 
|- align="center" bgcolor="#FFBBBB"
|61||L||February 10, 2002||0–4 || align="left"| @ San Jose Sharks (2001–02) ||24–21–11–5 || 17,486 || 
|- align="center" bgcolor="#FFBBBB"
|62||L||February 26, 2002||1–4 || align="left"| @ Toronto Maple Leafs (2001–02) ||24–22–11–5 || 19,359 || 
|- align="center" bgcolor="#CCFFCC" 
|63||W||February 28, 2002||6–2 || align="left"| @ Boston Bruins (2001–02) ||25–22–11–5 || 16,850 || 
|-

|- align="center" bgcolor="#CCFFCC" 
|64||W||March 2, 2002||4–3 || align="left"| @ Montreal Canadiens (2001–02) ||26–22–11–5 || 21,204 || 
|- align="center" bgcolor="#CCFFCC" 
|65||W||March 5, 2002||2–1 OT|| align="left"| @ Chicago Blackhawks (2001–02) ||27–22–11–5 || 13,255 || 
|- align="center" bgcolor="#CCFFCC" 
|66||W||March 7, 2002||3–1 || align="left"| @ Pittsburgh Penguins (2001–02) ||28–22–11–5 || 15,111 || 
|- align="center" 
|67||T||March 8, 2002||2–2 OT|| align="left"|  Washington Capitals (2001–02) ||28–22–12–5 || 18,730 || 
|- align="center" 
|68||T||March 11, 2002||3–3 OT|| align="left"|  Calgary Flames (2001–02) ||28–22–13–5 || 12,665 || 
|- align="center" bgcolor="#FFBBBB"
|69||L||March 16, 2002||2–3 || align="left"| @ Montreal Canadiens (2001–02) ||28–23–13–5 || 21,273 || 
|- align="center" 
|70||T||March 18, 2002||1–1 OT|| align="left"|  Montreal Canadiens (2001–02) ||28–23–14–5 || 16,472 || 
|- align="center" bgcolor="#CCFFCC" 
|71||W||March 21, 2002||3–2 || align="left"|  Florida Panthers (2001–02) ||29–23–14–5 || 15,088 || 
|- align="center" bgcolor="#CCFFCC" 
|72||W||March 23, 2002||4–2 || align="left"| @ New Jersey Devils (2001–02) ||30–23–14–5 || 18,099 || 
|- align="center" bgcolor="#FFBBBB"
|73||L||March 26, 2002||2–3 || align="left"|  Boston Bruins (2001–02) ||30–24–14–5 || 18,005 || 
|- align="center" bgcolor="#CCFFCC" 
|74||W||March 28, 2002||4–1 || align="left"|  Philadelphia Flyers (2001–02) ||31–24–14–5 || 18,730 || 
|- align="center" bgcolor="#CCFFCC"
|75||W||March 30, 2002||2–0 || align="left"| @ Boston Bruins (2001–02) ||32–24–14–5 || 17,565 || 
|-

|- align="center" bgcolor="#FFBBBB"
|76||L||April 2, 2002||3–4 || align="left"| @ Ottawa Senators (2001–02) ||32–25–14–5 || 16,371 || 
|- align="center" bgcolor="#FFBBBB"
|77||L||April 3, 2002||2–3 || align="left"|  New Jersey Devils (2001–02) ||32–26–14–5 || 16,587 || 
|- align="center" 
|78||T||April 7, 2002||1–1 OT|| align="left"|  Atlanta Thrashers (2001–02) ||32–26–15–5 || 18,730 || 
|- align="center" bgcolor="#CCFFCC" 
|79||W||April 8, 2002||2–1 || align="left"| @ New York Islanders (2001–02) ||33–26–15–5 || 13,729 || 
|- align="center" bgcolor="#CCFFCC" 
|80||W||April 10, 2002||4–2 || align="left"|  Tampa Bay Lightning (2001–02) ||34–26–15–5 || 18,210 || 
|- align="center" bgcolor="#CCFFCC" 
|81||W||April 12, 2002||3–1 || align="left"| @ Florida Panthers (2001–02) ||35–26–15–5 || 19,250 || 
|- align="center" 
|82||T||April 14, 2002||2–2 OT|| align="left"| @ Atlanta Thrashers (2001–02) ||35–26–16–5 || 18,545 || 
|-

|-
| Legend:

Playoffs

|- align="center" bgcolor="#CCFFCC"
| 1 ||W|| April 17, 2002 || 2–1 || align="left"| New Jersey Devils || Hurricanes lead 1–0 || 
|- align="center" bgcolor="#CCFFCC"
| 2 ||W|| April 19, 2002 || 2–1 OT || align="left"| New Jersey Devils || Hurricanes lead 2–0 || 
|- align="center" bgcolor="#FFBBBB"
| 3 ||L|| April 21, 2002 || 0–4 || align="left"| @ New Jersey Devils || Hurricanes lead 2–1 || 
|- align="center" bgcolor="#FFBBBB"
| 4 ||L|| April 23, 2002 || 1–3 || align="left"| @ New Jersey Devils || Series tied 2–2 || 
|- align="center" bgcolor="#CCFFCC"
| 5 ||W|| April 24, 2002 || 3–2 OT || align="left"| New Jersey Devils || Hurricanes lead 3–2 || 
|- align="center" bgcolor="#CCFFCC"
| 6 ||W|| April 27, 2002 || 1–0 || align="left"| @ New Jersey Devils || Hurricanes win 4–2 || 
|-

|- align="center" bgcolor="#CCFFCC"
| 1 ||W|| May 3, 2002 || 2–0 || align="left"| Montreal Canadiens || Hurricanes lead 1–0 || 
|- align="center" bgcolor="#FFBBBB"
| 2 ||L|| May 5, 2002 || 1–4 || align="left"| Montreal Canadiens || Series tied 1–1 || 
|- align="center" bgcolor="#FFBBBB"
| 3 ||L|| May 7, 2002 || 1–2 OT || align="left"| @ Montreal Canadiens || Canadiens lead 2–1 || 
|- align="center" bgcolor="#CCFFCC"
| 4 ||W|| May 9, 2002 || 4–3 OT || align="left"| @ Montreal Canadiens || Series tied 2–2 || 
|- align="center" bgcolor="#CCFFCC"
| 5 ||W|| May 12, 2002 || 5–1 || align="left"| Montreal Canadiens || Hurricanes lead 3–2 || 
|- align="center" bgcolor="#CCFFCC"
| 6 ||W|| May 13, 2002 || 8–2 || align="left"| @ Montreal Canadiens || Hurricanes win 4–2 || 
|-

|- align="center" bgcolor="#FFBBBB"
| 1 ||L || May 16, 2002 || 1–2 || align="left"| Toronto Maple Leafs || Maple Leafs lead 1–0 || 
|- align="center" bgcolor="#CCFFCC"
| 2 ||W || May 19, 2002 || 2–1 OT || align="left"| Toronto Maple Leafs || Series tied 1–1 || 
|- align="center" bgcolor="#CCFFCC"
| 3 ||W || May 21, 2002 || 2–1 OT || align="left"| @ Toronto Maple Leafs || Hurricanes lead 2–1 || 
|- align="center" bgcolor="#CCFFCC"
| 4 ||W || May 23, 2002 || 3–0 || align="left"| @ Toronto Maple Leafs || Hurricanes lead 3–1 || 
|- align="center" bgcolor="#FFBBBB"
| 5 ||L || May 25, 2002 || 0–1 || align="left"| Toronto Maple Leafs || Hurricanes lead 3-2 || 
|- align="center" bgcolor="#CCFFCC"
| 6 ||W || May 28, 2002 || 2–1 OT || align="left"| @ Toronto Maple Leafs || Hurricanes win 4–2 || 
|-

|- align="center" bgcolor="#CCFFCC"
| 1 ||W|| June 4, 2002 || 3–2 OT || align="left"| @ Detroit Red Wings || Hurricanes lead 1–0 || 
|- align="center" bgcolor="#FFBBBB"
| 2 ||L|| June 6, 2002 || 1–3 || align="left"| @ Detroit Red Wings || Series tied 1–1 || 
|- align="center" bgcolor="#FFBBBB"
| 3 ||L|| June 8, 2002 || 2–3 3OT || align="left"| Detroit Red Wings || Red Wings lead 2–1 || 
|- align="center" bgcolor="#FFBBBB"
| 4 ||L|| June 10, 2002 || 0–3 || align="left"| Detroit Red Wings || Red Wings lead 3–1 || 
|- align="center" bgcolor="#FFBBBB"
| 5 ||L|| June 13, 2002 || 1–3 || align="left"| @ Detroit Red Wings || Red Wings win 4–1 || 
|-

|-
| Legend:

Player statistics

Scoring
 Position abbreviations: C = Center; D = Defense; G = Goaltender; LW = Left Wing; RW = Right Wing
  = Joined team via a transaction (e.g., trade, waivers, signing) during the season. Stats reflect time with the Hurricanes only.
  = Left team via a transaction (e.g., trade, waivers, release) during the season. Stats reflect time with the Hurricanes only.

Goaltending
  = Joined team via a transaction (e.g., trade, waivers, signing) during the season. Stats reflect time with the Hurricanes only.
  = Left team via a transaction (e.g., trade, waivers, release) during the season. Stats reflect time with the Hurricanes only.

Awards and honors
Ron Francis, King Clancy Memorial Trophy
Ron Francis, Lady Byng Memorial Trophy

Transactions
The Hurricanes were involved in the following transactions from June 10, 2001, the day after the deciding game of the 2001 Stanley Cup Finals, through June 13, 2002, the day of the deciding game of the 2002 Stanley Cup Finals.

Trades

Players acquired

Players lost

Signings

Draft picks

Carolina's picks at the 2001 NHL Entry Draft in Sunrise, Florida. The Hurricanes have the 15th overall pick.

Farm teams

American Hockey League 
The Lowell Lock Monsters were the Hurricanes American Hockey League affiliate for the 2001–02 AHL season.

East Coast Hockey League 
The Florida Everblades were the Hurricanes East Coast Hockey League affiliate.

Notes

References

Eastern Conference (NHL) championship seasons
Carol
Carol
Carolina Hurricanes seasons
Car
Hurr
Hurr